Major-General Sybrand Abraham Engelbrecht  (Clanwilliam, 4 April 1913 – 6 September 1994) was a South African military commander.  He joined the South African Army in June 1936, and was appointed 2nd Lieutenant in January 1937. He attended an Ordnance Officers Course at the Royal Military College of Science from January 1939 to July 1939. He served in World War II in the Middle East.

After the War he served as the Dean of the Military College. He was then  Explosives, Deputy Quartermaster General, Officer Commanding North West Transvaal Command and Officer Commanding Northern Command (South Africa).

He served as Army Chief of Staff from 1959 to 1963, when he took early retirement.  He returned to active duty for a few years in the 1970s, as a staff officer with the South African Special Forces.

Awards and decorations

See also
 List of South African military chiefs
 South African Army

References

Further reading

External links

1913 births
1994 deaths
Afrikaner people
South African people of Dutch descent
Chiefs of the South African Army
South African military personnel of World War II